Klyment Vasilyovich Kvitka (February 4, 1880 – September 19, 1953) was a Ukrainian and Soviet musicologist and ethnographer, and the husband of poet Lesya Ukrainka.

The Kvitka family played an important role in the initiative of the preservation of kobzar music by means of sound recording using the recently invented phonograph.

References

1880 births
1953 deaths
Soviet musicologists
20th-century Ukrainian musicians
People from Romensky Uyezd
Academic staff of Moscow Conservatory
Recipients of the Order of the Red Banner of Labour
Ukrainian ethnographers
Ukrainian male writers
Ukrainian musicologists

Burials at Vagankovo Cemetery
Soviet ethnographers